Byfield is a village and civil parish forming part of West Northamptonshire, England. The population (including Westhorp) of the civil parish at the 2011 census was 1,277.

History 
The villages name means 'by the open land'. It has also been suggested that the first element is 'river-bend'.

Byfield, with Westhorp, was mentioned in the Domesday Book. It has been close to many of the important events in history. During the Wars of the Roses, in 1469 the battle of Edgecote took place, only three miles from Byfield. Likewise during the English Civil War, the battles of Edgehill in 1642 and Naseby in 1645 must have affected the local citizenry. In the Second World War the area around Byfield had numerous airfields and other military installations which would have had a considerable, and in some cases, long-lasting effect. One example of this is POW camp 87 which sits between Byfield and Upper Boddington, however the site is currently home to a scrap merchant; there are plans to convert the former camp into a recycling centre. 

Byfield once had a station on the Stratford-upon-Avon and Midland Junction Railway (later part of the London, Midland and Scottish Railway), but this closed in April 1952. One of the platforms of the station is still visible on the original site, however it is heavily overgrown. The remains of the goods shed is still visible. Two of the three bridges are still in the village, one being on the Twistle and the other being on the main road towards Banbury on the A361. Byfield was also home to an ironstone railway;  This railway closed in 1965 along with the SMJR network 

Byfield was also the home of British folk-rock singer-songwriter Sandy Denny, and her husband Trevor Lucas, from 1974 until her death in 1978. A number of Sandy's demos issued since her death (most notably on the 2004 box set A Boxful of Treasures) were recorded at home in Byfield and in 2017 the BBC unveiled a plaque commemorating her last professional gig in Byfield Village Hall.

Geography
The village of Byfield is situated in the folds of the northern edge of the Cotswolds, in the south-western corner of Northamptonshire, some four miles east of the intersection with the boundaries of Oxfordshire and Warwickshire. Byfield also lies almost equidistant between Daventry to the north and Banbury to the south on the A361 road, each about nine to 10 miles distant. Northampton lies 19 miles east. Because of this geographic position, and the 50 mph speed limit in either direction, the residents of Byfield look to both Northamptonshire and Oxfordshire for fulfillment of many of their service needs. This is especially true of areas such as healthcare, shopping and major items of furniture, white goods, meals out, gym membership and the like.

Governance
Byfield has had a Parish Council continuously since 1894, and this continuity has meant that the parish is actively managed for the good of its residents.

Demography
Byfield has a population of around 1,200-1,250 (1,252 in the 2001 census), increasing to 1,277 at the 2011 census. 1,032 electors (2007 Electoral Register) plus children. The Parish still has a high level of agriculture, as it has some 10 or so working farms, although like all modern farming they employ very few people. The other areas of employment are the usual modern mix of commuting, self-employed and people who have locally based jobs, often part-time.

Recreation 
There are some 30 different clubs and organisations active in Byfield such as karate, over 60s club and the men's breakfast club. Byfield has a large recreation ground, The Brightwell, which has bowls, cricket, football and tennis clubs as well as a children's playground and other recreational space. The village hall is the venue for a number of weekly events as well as one-off theatres, shows, exhibitions, quiz evenings, dances, weddings, parties etc.

Byfield Village Club which was formerly known as Byfield Conservative Club has a membership of over 200 and is the venue for live music, social events and parties. There are active darts and skittles teams as well as a full-size snooker table in the upstairs games room. The Village Club is housed in a former school house; the building itself being several hundred years old. The club went out of business in early 2017 and the building is up for sale.

An active Scout Group exists in the village which was first founded in 1911. Today it provides activities for approximately 60 young people aged 6–14.

In the 1950s and 1960s, Byfield's Brian, Bob, Cecil, and Bruce Laurie were well-known stock-car drivers, at Northamptonshire's Brafield Stadium and around England's stock car tracks.

References

External links 

Information on Byfield, with weekly news etc.

Villages in Northamptonshire
West Northamptonshire District
Civil parishes in Northamptonshire